Monika Steinmetz (born 6 January 1960) is a German former footballer who played as a midfielder. She made 22 appearances for the Germany national team from 1982 to 1987.

References

External links
 

1960 births
Living people
German women's footballers
Women's association football midfielders
Germany women's international footballers